Gather Up the Chaps is the second studio album by the Chicago-based punk rock supergroup The Falcon which was released by Red Scare Industries on March 18, 2016, almost ten years after their debut album Unicornography.

Track listing 
 The Trash - 2:12
 War of Colossus - 1:42
 Sergio's Here - 2:09
 The Skeleton Dance - 2:42
 Hasselhoff Cheeseburger - 2:05
 Dead Rose - 2:25
 The Fighter, The Rube, The Asshole - 1:56
 If Dave Did It - 1:50
 Sailor's Grave - 2:33
 Glue Factory - 1:53
 You Dumb Dildos - 2:37
 Black Teeth - 1:54

Performers 
 Brendan Kelly – vocals, guitar
 Neil Hennessy – drums, backing vocals
 Dan Andriano – bass, backing vocals, lead vocals on #11
 Dave Hause – guitar, backing vocals, lead vocals on #8

References 

2016 albums
Red Scare Industries albums
The Falcon (band) albums